Vlastimil Linhart (born 13 November 1927) is a Czech former swimmer. He competed in the men's 200 metre breaststroke at the 1952 Summer Olympics.

References

External links
 

1927 births
Possibly living people
Czech male swimmers
Olympic swimmers of Czechoslovakia
Swimmers at the 1952 Summer Olympics
Place of birth missing (living people)
Male breaststroke swimmers